Sensu is a Latin word meaning "in the sense of", most often used in biological nomenclature.

Sensu may also refer to:

 Sensu, a Japanese word that means folding fan
 Sensu or cinsaut, a wine grape
 Sensu (software) to automate monitoring workflow to gain deep visibility into the IT infrastructure, applications, and operations, e.g. in Kubernetes.